Dr and The Crippens are a British hardcore band from Lancaster, England, who recorded and toured in the late 1980s and early 1990s. They became known for unusual costumes and innovative use of stage props during their live shows which included frequent use of an exploding head. The band recorded two sessions for Radio 1 DJ John Peel on 8 May 1988 and 16 July 1989.

Members
Max Von Reinheart (Nick Palmer) - Vocals
Tom Crippen (Tom Myall) – Guitar/Vocals
Wayne Crippenski (Wayne Elliot) – Bass/Vocals
Jesus Van Gogh (Dave Ellesmere) – Drums/Vocals
BB Kablamo – Drums
Emily Danger - Guest vocals on "Don't look in the freezer"

Discography

Studio albums
Fired From The Circus (1988)
Raphanadosis (1989)

Live albums
Live Hearts (1992)

EPs
Avant Gardening (1989)

Singles
"Live" (1989)
"Turn To Gas" (1991)
"Untitled" / "Until This Sky Will Be Parted" (1991)

Compilations
Digging In Water (1987)
Hardcore Holocaust - The Peel Sessions (1988)
The North Atlantic Noise Attack (1989)
Hardcore Holocaust II - The Peel Sessions (1990)
Manic Ears - The Histyrical Years '86-'90 (1990)
Grind Your Mind - A History Of Grindcore (2007)
Trapped In A Scene UK Hardcore 1985-1989 (2009)
Cabaret Style (Singles Unreleased Live) (2015)

VHS
Live Snit - Live at the Fulham Greyhound, London (1989)

References

British hardcore punk groups